Passo do Verde ("green pitch") is a district of the municipality of Santa Maria, in the Brazilian state of Rio Grande do Sul. It is situated in the south portion of Santa Maria. The district's seat is located 23 km (14,29 miles) from Downtown Santa Maria, nearby the Vacacaí River close to the boundary of Santa Maria with São Sepé.

The district of Passo do Verde owns an area of 133.40 km2 that is equivalent to 7.45% of the municipality of Santa Maria that is 1791,65 km2.

History 
The district was created on April 19, 1994, by municipal law 3770/94 with area deducted from district of Santa Flora.

Geography 
The district is situated in the south portion of municipality of Santa Maria. Altogether the relief is suavely undulating and is characterized by the presence of floodplains and coxilhas without big difference with its altimetric elevations.

Limits 

The district limits with the districts of Arroio do Só, Pains and Santa Flora, and, with the municipalities of Formigueiro and São Sepé.

Neighbourhoods 
The district of Passo do Verde is divided in the following bairros, that in English is equivalent to neighbourhoods:
 Passo do Verde;

Roads and railway 
 In the district there isn't any railway;
 The BR-392 highway crosses the district parting the district in east and west.

See also 
 District of Passo do Verde, in Portuguese wikipedia.

References

External links 
 Site oficial da Prefeitura de Santa Maria

Districts of Santa Maria, Rio Grande do Sul